Dame Maeve Geraldine Fort  (19 November 1940 – 18 September 2008) was a British diplomat. During her posting as the United Kingdom's High Commissioner in South Africa from 1996 to 2000, she was the highest ranking female diplomat in Her Majesty's Diplomatic Service.

Early life
Born on 19 November 1940 in Liverpool, Fort was the only child of a hospital administrator. She attended Nantwich Grammar School, but left before completing her A-Levels when she discovered that Trinity College, Dublin did not then require entrants to have taken them.

She achieved a sufficiently good degree in English and French to gain a scholarship for study at the Sorbonne from the French government.

Foreign Office

Early career
Fort decided to apply to join the Foreign Office, despite the fact that she was advised that as a female, and not even an Oxbridge graduate, she had little chance of being selected. However, she became one of just twelve successful candidates to be appointed to the junior grade at the Foreign Office in 1962.

Postings to New York City, Bangkok (a secondment to SEATO), Bonn and Lagos followed, with appointment as an officer in the Diplomatic Service on 24 April 1973. Fort was later promoted to First Secretary at the Foreign and Commonwealth Office, and in 1978, she returned to New York as part of the UK's mission to the United Nations. Here, she began to specialise in African affairs, in particular on the Namibia contact group, working towards a peaceful independence for Namibia. At one time, she was told to prepare for a posting to the High Commission in Windhoek, Namibia, but it was suddenly cancelled.

Chile, Mozambique and Lebanon
Fort returned to the UK in 1982, to study at the Royal College of Defence Studies for a year. She was then promoted to counsellor and posted to Santiago, Chile. She was recalled to the Foreign Office in 1986, serving as head of the West African department, and concurrently as non-resident Ambassador to Chad, which was then considered too dangerous to host a resident ambassador, due to the ongoing Chadian–Libyan conflict.

Fort was then appointed Ambassador to Mozambique in 1989.  Mozambique was still in the throes of its civil war and Fort became involved in the negotiations to bring the conflict to and end, building contacts between President Joaquim Chissano and the RENAMO leader, Afonso Dhlakama. She was appointed a Companion of the Order of St Michael and St George (CMG) in the 1990 New Year Honours.

In 1992, Fort volunteered to become Ambassador to Lebanon, another dangerous posting. She had a close protection team of six bodyguards from the Royal Military Police — Fort referred to them as 'her boys'. The situation in Lebanon was such that she lived in a fortified compound, and travelled in an armoured Range Rover — her escape was walking in the Lebanese mountains, still accompanied by 'the boys', one of whom carried her beloved dog, Chloe, a white Pomeranian-Maltese cross, in a knapsack.

South Africa
Fort was appointed High Commissioner to South Africa in 1996, two years after Nelson Mandela became the first black president of that country. She soon became a friend and confidant of Mandela and other high-ranking South Africans.

In 1997, her previous association with negotiations relating to Namibia and Mozambique, proved useful again as the situation in Angola deteriorated. She hosted Prince Charles on an official visit, shortly after the death of Diana, Princess of Wales.

Fort was promoted to Dame Commander of the Order of St Michael and St George (DCMG) in 1998, and became a rare 'double dame' when she was appointed Dame Commander of the Royal Victorian Order (DCVO) on 9 November 1999, during Queen Elizabeth II's state visit to South Africa.

Death
Dame Maeve Fort died in London, aged 67, following a short illness.

References

Sources

1940 births
2008 deaths
Alumni of Trinity College Dublin
Dames Commander of the Order of St Michael and St George
Dames Commander of the Royal Victorian Order
Double dames
Ambassadors and High Commissioners of the United Kingdom to South Africa
Diplomats from Liverpool
University of Paris alumni
Ambassadors of the United Kingdom to Mozambique
Ambassadors of the United Kingdom to Chad
Ambassadors of the United Kingdom to Lebanon
British women ambassadors
British expatriates in France
British expatriates in the United States
British expatriates in Germany
British expatriates in Nigeria